No Control is a 1927 American silent comedy film directed by Scott Sidney and starring Harrison Ford, Phyllis Haver and Jack Duffy.

Cast
 Harrison Ford as John Douglas Jr
 Phyllis Haver as Nancy Flood
 Jack Duffy as 	Noah Flood
 Tom Wilson as Asthma
 Toby Claude as Mrs. Douglas
 E.J. Ratcliffe as John Douglas
 Larry Steers as Kid Dugan
 Albert Schaefer as The Fat Kid

References

Bibliography
 Connelly, Robert B. The Silents: Silent Feature Films, 1910-36, Volume 40, Issue 2. December Press, 1998.
 Munden, Kenneth White. The American Film Institute Catalog of Motion Pictures Produced in the United States, Part 1. University of California Press, 1997.

External links
 

1927 films
1927 comedy films
1920s English-language films
American silent feature films
Silent American comedy films
Films directed by Scott Sidney
American black-and-white films
Producers Distributing Corporation films
1920s American films